Sophia Arvaniti (Greek: Σοφία Αρβανίτη), (May 4, 1968) is a Greek singer. Her second album, Μη Μου Μιλάς Για Καλοκαίρια (1990), was certified Gold in Greece for sales of over 50,000 units.

Arvaniti is best known outside Greece for her 1992 single "The Desert Is in Your Heart" with Bonnie Tyler, which features on Arvaniti's album Parafora (Παράφορα).

Discography
 Το Όνομα Μου Είναι Σοφία (1988)
 Μη Μου Μιλάς Για Καλοκαίρια (1990)
 Παράφορα  (1992)
 Ζωή Σαν Πορτοκάλι (1993)
 Στον Αέρα (1994)
 Η Αγάπη Τα Πάντα Νικάει (1995)
 Καινούρια Μέρα (1996)
  Κόκκινη Κλωστή  (1998)
 Συμπτωματικά (2000)
 Χωρίς Retouche (2009)
 Αλαβαρντάχαλα (Τραγούδια Των Καιρών) (2017)

References

1968 births
Living people
20th-century Greek women singers
Singers from Athens